Matthew Parker (1504–1575) was Archbishop of Canterbury from 1559 until his death.

Matthew Parker or Matt Parker may also refer to:

 Matthew Parker (bishop) (born 1963), British Anglican bishop; current area Bishop of Stafford
 Matthew Parker (cricketer) (born 1990), Scottish cricketer
 Matthew Parker (footballer) (born 1996), Australian rules footballer
 Matthew Parker (singer) (born 1994), American contemporary Christian music singer-songwriter
 Matt Parker (born 1980), Australian stand-up comedian, author and YouTube personality
 Matthew Parker (author) (born 1970), English author

 Matt Parker (Holby City), a fictional character in BBC TV drama Holby City